Zlatníky-Hodkovice is a municipality in Prague-West District in the Central Bohemian Region of the Czech Republic. It has about 1,300 inhabitants.

Administrative parts
The municipality is made up of villages of Zlatníky and Hodkovice.

History
The first written mention of Zlatníky is from 1300 and of Hodkovice from 1314.

In 1961 the formerly independent municipality of Hodkovice was joined to Zlatníky as its administrative part. Since 1999 the municipality has its current name.

References

Villages in Prague-West District